The Golden State Pops Orchestra (GSPO) is an American symphony pops orchestra located in the San Pedro district of Los Angeles, California in the United States of America.  The GSPO is the resident orchestra of the Warner Grand Theatre, an Art Deco movie palace built by Warner Brothers Studios in 1931.  The orchestra performs a wide variety of musical repertoire, including classical, Broadway, pop music and even video game soundtracks.  However, the primary focus of the GSPO remains film music, a specialty of the orchestra since its founding in 2002.  The Golden State Pops Orchestra is composed of professional freelance musicians from around the Los Angeles area.

History 

The Golden State Pops Orchestra (GSPO) was founded in 2002 by conductor and composer Steven Allen Fox, a graduate of the University of Southern California's Scoring for Motion Pictures and Television (SMPTV) program.  Joshua Godoy, also a USC film scoring graduate, served as the assistant conductor.  Initially functioning as the instrumental division of the Southeast Civic Light Opera in Los Alamitos, California, the orchestra's original home venue was the Liberty Theatre on the Los Alamitos Joint Forces Military Base.

The first public performance of the Golden State Pops Orchestra took place on April 6, 2002 at the Riviera United Methodist Church in Redondo Beach, California.  The concert featured film music, and was titled Hooked on Film Scores.  The Orchestra then performed four additional concerts in 2002, mostly at the Liberty Theatre.

Following its début season, the GSPO separated from the Southeast Civic Light Opera and moved its performances to the Long Beach Events Center (Scottish Rite Cathedral) in Long Beach, California for a portion of the 2003-2004 season, beginning with a St. Patrick's Day themed concert titled St. Pat Goes Pops! on March 15, 2003, and continuing with four additional concerts in Long Beach.  In 2004, the orchestra moved to its current home venue, the Warner Grand Theatre in San Pedro, California, premiering with a Valentine's Day themed concert titled Music for Lovers and Other Strangers on February 7, 2004.

Since 2004, the GSPO has become the resident orchestra of the Warner Grand Theatre, and has grown into a professional ensemble of around 60 musicians.  It continues to specialize in live performances of film scores, and frequently introduces new film music repertoire to its audiences; music that has not been performed since it was first recorded at the original scoring sessions.  In 2005, the orchestra gave the North American concert premiere of film composer John Williams' Battle of the Heroes from Star Wars: Episode III – Revenge of the Sith as part of its all Star Wars concert. Since 2005, the orchestra has presented over seventy world premieres to its audiences, both from recent films such as Drag Me to Hell, Avatar, Astro Boy, Superman Returns, and Scream as well as older films such as Three Amigos, Mysterious Island, and The Fall of the Roman Empire.

GSPO Ensemble Series 

In addition to its regular full orchestra concerts, the Golden State Pops Orchestra presents a series of chamber music concerts at the Grand Annex, Alvas Showroom, the First Presbyterian Church and other venues located near the orchestra's home venue of the Warner Grand Theatre.  The GSPO Ensemble Series concerts consist of regular orchestra members who perform chamber music in a wide variety of styles from film and television music to classical repertoire.

World Premieres 

The Golden State Pops Orchestra has focused on live concert performances of film music from its inception. Due to the orchestra's connections with the film and music industry in Los Angeles, it has been able to perform many pieces of music for the first time outside the original films, often with the original composer in attendance or even conducting the orchestra.  Some of the world premieres that have been performed by the GSPO include:

2014

Elmer Bernstein: Comedy Suite, featuring music from the films Animal House, Airplane!, Stripes, Trading Places, Three Amigos and Spies Like Us.  Arranged and conducted by the composer's son, Peter Bernstein. (February 15, 2014)
Elmer Bernstein: Rarely Performed Works, a suite featuring Silver from the 1956 LP, Frank Sinatra Conducts Tone Poems of Color as well as Bernstein's scores to the films Desire Under the Elms and Stripes.  Also featuring music from the composer's rejected scores to the films The Journey of Natty Gann and A River Runs Through It.  Arranged and conducted by the composer's son, Peter Bernstein. (February 15, 2014)

2013

Vince Guaraldi: A Charlie Brown Christmas Suite, arranged and conducted by William Ross. (December 21, 2013)
Bernard Herrmann: A Christmas Carol, with script and lyrics by Maxwell Anderson. (December 21, 2013)
Elmer Bernstein: Suite from Ghostbusters, as arranged and orchestrated by Randy Edelman, with the arranger conducting and Sara Andon as flute soloist. (October 19, 2013)
Bernard Herrmann: Suite from The Ghost and Mrs. Muir, conducted by John Debney. (October 19, 2013)
Varèse Sarabande Halloween Overture featuring music from the films Halloween, A Nightmare on Elm Street, The Fly, Psycho, and The Omen. Arranged and conducted by Joseph LoDuca. (October 19, 2013)
Christopher Young: Suite from Ghost Rider, featuring Dave Lombardo as drum soloist and the band Philm. (October 19, 2013)
John Williams: Here They Come, Luke and Leia, The Asteroid Field, The Forest Battle, and Cantina Band from Hal Leonard's newly published orchestral suite The Star Wars Saga. (June 15, 2013)
Gordy Haab: Star Wars: The Old Republic Suite from the game Star Wars: The Old Republic with the composer in attendance. (June 15, 2013)
Kyle Newmaster & Gordy Haab: Star Wars Kinect Suite from the game Kinect Star Wars with the composers in attendance. (June 15, 2013)
Kyle Newmaster & Gordy Haab: Main Theme from Ryan vs. Dorkman 2 with the composers in attendance. (June 15, 2013)
Joel McNeely: The Southern Underground from Star Wars: Shadows of the Empire. (June 15, 2013)
Varèse Sarabande 35th Anniversary Overture featuring music from the films The Sea Hawk, Basic Instinct, The Boy Who Could Fly, Unforgiven, Back to the Future Part III, and City Slickers. (May 11, 2013)
Varèse Sarabande 35th Anniversary Sci-Fi Overture featuring music from the films The Iron Giant, Lifeforce, Terminator 2: Judgment Day, RoboCop, The Abyss, Air Force One, Aliens, The Matrix, and Stargate with Christopher Lennertz conducting. (May 11, 2013)
John Debney: Theme from The Ant Bully, with the composer conducting. (May 11, 2013)
Michael Giacchino: Suite from Star Trek Into Darkness, with the composer conducting. (May 11, 2013)
Harry Gregson-Williams:  Music from Shrek. (May 11, 2013)
Danny Elfman: Music from Pee-Wee's Big Adventure, with the composer in attendance. (May 11, 2013)
Elmer Bernstein:  To Kill a Mockingbird as arranged by Austin Wintory, with the arranger conducting and Sara Andon as flute soloist. (May 11, 2013)
Georges Delerue:  A Little Romance, with Sara Andon as flute soloist. (American premiere, May 11, 2013)
Alex North:  Spartacus Love Theme as arranged by Lee Holdridge, with Diego Navarro conducting and Sara Andon as flute soloist. (American premiere, May 11, 2013)
Joel McNeely:  Music from Iron Will, with the composer conducting. (American premiere, May 11, 2013) 
Alan Silvestri: Family Theme from The Croods, with the composer in attendance.  Premiered before the film's release. (February 16, 2013)

2011
John Debney:  Music from Elf, as arranged by Victor Pesavento (December 17, 2011)
Andrew Lloyd Webber: Phantasia, based on The Phantom of the Opera, as arranged and orchestrated by Geoffrey Alexander.  Featuring Alyssa Park, violin and Timothy Loo, cello. (North American premiere: October 29, 2011)
Austin Wintory:  Boxes of Earth, with the composer conducting.  Featuring Lisbeth Scott, vocalist (October 29, 2011)
Nathan Barr: Collection of Cues from the HBO series True Blood, with the composer in attendance.  Featuring Lisbeth Scott, vocalist (October 29, 2011)
Richard M. Sherman: The Eyes of Love, a song deleted from film Mary Poppins, as arranged by Jonathan Hughes (September 24, 2011)
Richard M. Sherman: Mary Poppins Medley, consisting of songs from the film Mary Poppins, as arranged and adapted by Victor Pesavento and Jonathan Hughes (September 24, 2011)
Richard M. Sherman: Animation Medley, consisting of songs from the films The Many Adventures of Winnie the Pooh, The Aristocats, Charlotte's Web and The Jungle Book, as arranged and adapted by Victor Pesavento and Jonathan Hughes (September 24, 2011)
Richard M. Sherman:  Four Forgotten Dreams, orchestral setting by Stu Phillips (September 24, 2011)
Richard M. Sherman: Overture from the film Tom Sawyer, as arranged and orchestrated by John Williams (September 24, 2011)
Richard M. Sherman: Chitty Chitty Bang Bang, a medley consisting of Hushabye Mountain and Chitty Chitty Bang Bang, as arranged by Jonathan Hughes (September 24, 2011)
Richard M. Sherman: Fortuosity, from The Happiest Millionaire, as arranged by Victor Pesavento and Jonathan Hughes (September 24, 2011)
Richard M. Sherman: Enchanted Journeys, a medley of music from Disney Theme parks, including The Wonderful World of Color, Magic Journeys, The Tiki Tiki Tiki Room, and There's a Great Big Beautiful Tomorrow, as arranged by Jonathan Hughes (September 24, 2011)
Richard M. Sherman: The Slipper and the Rose Waltz, a tone poem based on themes from the film The Slipper and the Rose, as arranged by Stu Phillips (September 24, 2011)
Richard M. Sherman: Ten Feet Off The Ground, from the film The One and Only, Genuine, Original Family Band as arranged by Stu Phillips (September 24, 2011)
Richard M. Sherman: Five Rockin' Oldies, a medley of The Monkey's Uncle, Tall Paul, Pineapple Princess, Let's Get Together, and You're Sixteen, as arranged by Stu Phillips (September 24, 2011)
Jerry Goldsmith: The Gold Standard, a medley of thirty of Goldsmith's film score themes, as arranged by Austin Wintory (June 11, 2011)
Sean Murray: Deviant from the video game, Call of Duty: Black Ops, with the composer and the orchestrator in attendance (April 9, 2011)
Austin Wintory:  Journey - Suite I, with the composer conducting.  Featuring Tina Guo, cello soloist (April 9, 2011)
Gerard Marino:  City of Darkness/City of Light from the video game DC Universe Online, with the composer conducting (April 9, 2011)
Russell Brower: The Shattering from the video game World of Warcraft: Cataclysm with the composer in attendance (April 9, 2011)

Current Season (2013 - 2014)

Previous Season (2012 - 2013)

Past Seasons

References 

Los Angeles Times

External links 
  www.gspo.com 

Pops orchestras
Musical groups established in 2002
2002 establishments in California
Musical groups from Los Angeles
Orchestras based in California